Vokesimurex chrysostoma, common name the gold-mouthed murex, is a species of sea snail, a marine gastropod mollusk in the family Muricidae, the murex snails or rock snails.

Description
The size of the shell varies between 35 mm and 80 mm.

Distribution
This marine species occurs from the southern part of the Caribbean Sea to Brasil.

References

 Houart R. (2014). Living Muricidae of the world. Muricinae. Murex, Promurex, Haustellum, Bolinus, Vokesimurex and Siratus. Harxheim: ConchBooks. 197 pp.

External links
 

Gastropods described in 1834
Vokesimurex